Mor or Moor is a tonal Austronesian language in the putative Cenderawasih branch (Geelvink Bay) of Indonesian Papua. 

Its dialects are Ayombai, Hirom, and Kama.

References

Further reading

 Kamholz, David (2009) More Moor (Cenderawasih Bay, Papua, Indonesia) – Handout on Moor phonology, morphology and syntax

External links
 Mor-English glossary from PanLex

South Halmahera–West New Guinea languages
Languages of western New Guinea
Tonal languages in non-tonal families